Yuexi County, Sichuan is a county located in the north of the Liangshan Yi Autonomous Prefecture, in the south of Sichuan Province, China.

Fauna
The frog species Oreolalax liangbeiensis, Oreolalax puxiongensis, and Oreolalax pingii are endemic to Yuexi County. The former two have only been recorded in the town of Puxiong.

Climate

References

 
Liangshan Yi Autonomous Prefecture
Amdo
County-level divisions of Sichuan